Point Roberts is a pene-exclave of Washington on the southernmost tip of the Tsawwassen peninsula, south of Vancouver, Canada. The area, which had a population of 1,191 at the 2020 census, is reached by land from the rest of the United States by traveling  through Canada. It is a census-designated place in Whatcom County, Washington, with a post office, and a ZIP Code of 98281. Direct sea and air connections with the rest of the U.S. are available across Boundary Bay.

Point Roberts was created when the United Kingdom and the United States settled the Pacific Northwest American-Canadian border dispute in the mid-19th century with the Oregon Treaty. The two parties agreed that the 49th parallel would define the boundary between their respective territories, and the small area that incorporates Point Roberts is south of the 49th parallel. Questions about ceding the territory to the United Kingdom and later to Canada have been raised since its creation but its status has remained unchanged.

History 

The area around the southern Tsawwassen Peninsula was a favored fishing spot for several Coast Salish groups, who named the peninsula "q̓ʷulƛ̕əl̕". The first Europeans to see Point Roberts were members of the 1791 expedition of Francisco de Eliza. The maps produced from Eliza's explorations depicted Point Roberts as "Isla de Cepeda" or "Isla de Zepeda." In 1792, the British expedition of George Vancouver and the Spanish expedition of Dionisio Alcalá Galiano encountered one another near Point Roberts. In the morning of June 13, 1792, the two ships under Galiano sailed into Boundary Bay and verified Point Roberts was not an island, which was thus renamed Punta Cepeda. They then sailed around Point Roberts and immediately encountered HMS Chatham, the second ship of Vancouver's expedition. The two parties made contact and agreed to share information and work together in mapping the Strait of Georgia.

Point Roberts acquired its present name from Vancouver, who named it after his friend Henry Roberts, who had originally been given command of the expedition. Point Roberts assumed its present political status in 1846, when the Oregon Treaty extended the 49th parallel as the boundary between U.S. and British territory from the Rocky Mountains to Georgia Strait.

Treaty history specific to Point Roberts 
After years of joint occupation of the disputed area between Mexican California and Russian America known as the Oregon Country to the Americans, and as the Columbia District to the British, American expansionists like U.S. Senator Edward A. Hannegan of Indiana urged U.S. President James K. Polk to annex the entire Oregon Country up to latitude 54°40′N, as the Democrats had been elected on the slogan "Fifty-Four Forty or Fight".

While his government asserted that the title of the United States of America to the entire territory was unquestionable even though there was only one U.S. resident (a former Briton) north of the Columbia basin, Polk and Secretary of State James Buchanan made an offer of a boundary at 49 degrees with the line straight across Vancouver Island, with no commercial privilege to be granted to the British south of the line, with the exception of free ports on Vancouver Island. The British rejected the offer and the U.S. soon withdrew it.

On April 18, 1846, notice was forwarded to London that the U.S. Congress had adopted a joint resolution abrogating the Treaty of 1818 which provided for joint occupancy.

The British emissary, Richard Pakenham, had been advised that the last concession he could expect of the United States was to bend the boundary at the 49th parallel around the southern end of Vancouver Island. Fort Victoria was viewed as the future center for settlements on the island. It was deemed necessary around this point in time to give up territory on the Lower Mainland to keep Vancouver Island part of British North America.

Lord Aberdeen, British Foreign Secretary, proposed a treaty making the 49th parallel the boundary to the sea, giving the UK the whole of Vancouver Island. The Treaty of Oregon was concluded on June 15, 1846.

The acceptance of the 49th parallel as the international boundary was concluded without precise knowledge of its effects. Later, as the Boundary Commission surveyed the line, the British government realized the peninsula of Point Roberts would be an isolated part of the United States. The British Foreign Office instructed Captain James Prevost, the British Boundary Commissioner, to inform his U.S. counterpart of the situation and request Point Roberts be left to Britain, because of the great inconvenience it would be to the United States. If the American Boundary Commission was reluctant, Prevost was instructed to offer "some equivalent compensation by a slight alteration of the Line of Boundary on the Mainland". It is not known how the U.S. commissioner responded, but Point Roberts remained part of the United States.

Relationship with Canada
During the 1858 Fraser gold rush, prospectors from Victoria, BC who were attempting to avoid tax collection briefly settled Point Roberts. Their settlement was called Robert's Town and consisted of six wooden buildings, including a store and saloon, but lasted less than a year.

In 1949, there was talk about Point Roberts seceding from the U.S. and joining Canada. A regional development plan for the Lower Mainland presented in 1952 suggested turning Point Roberts into an international park or leasing it for 99 or 999 years. In 1973, a drought that caused the wells to run dry created tensions between Point Roberts's U.S. and Canadian residents. The Americans threatened to cut off the Canadian residents' water supply — and hung up signs saying "Canadians Go Home" — unless the Canadian municipality of Delta agreed to provide water. An agreement signed on August 28, 1987, requires the Point Roberts Water District to purchase raw water on an annual basis from the Greater Vancouver Water District. Delta Fire Department also provides assistance to the Point Roberts volunteer fire department when requested. Until 1988, BC Tel (now Telus) provided telephone service; the sole exchange prefix of 945, officially part of area code 206, could also be dialed through area code 604 during the period of BC Tel ownership.

After the September 11 attacks of 2001, security at border crossings—including Point Roberts—was increased, leading to long delays for residents. The Canadian border was closed to non-essential travel in March 2020 due to the COVID-19 pandemic, which had been worsening in both countries but especially in the United States. A study found that Point Roberts had lost 80 percent of its business and hundreds of seasonal residents as a result of the pandemic and border shutdown. The area, described as a "ghost town" by the local chamber of commerce director, had no confirmed cases of COVID-19 . A temporary ferry was set up by the Port of Bellingham in August 2020 to connect Point Roberts to the mainland, initially to Blaine and later to Bellingham. The Canadian government waived its mandatory COVID testing requirements for Point Roberts residents in February 2021, following negotiations with Washington state. The border was fully reopened for non-essential travel in August 2021 and the ferry service ceased the same month.

During the COVID-19 pandemic, Point Roberts was acclaimed as the "safest place" for avoiding coronavirus due to its isolation from the mainland United States and Canada and very low case numbers. Because of limited access to the rest of Whatcom County and border closures into Canada, the case numbers remained very low.

Geography 

Point Roberts is a U.S. exclave bordered by Canada and the waters of Boundary Bay. Point Roberts is part of the U.S. because it lies south of the 49th parallel, which constitutes the Canada–US border in that area. Other exclaves of this type include parts of Minnesota such as the Northwest Angle and Elm Point, Minnesota. Alburgh, Vermont and nearby Province Point are separated from the rest of the U.S. by Lake Champlain, though Alburgh is reachable by highway bridge from "mainland" Vermont.

Point Roberts borders the municipality of Delta in British Columbia. Boundary Bay lies to the east of Point Roberts and the Strait of Georgia to the south and west.

Geology

Beneath Point Roberts, the bedrock of the Chuckanut Formation was deposited as an alluvial plain containing layers of sediments consisting of silt, sand, sand and gravel, and peat. During the last 60 million years the sediments were compacted and folded by mountain building forces from continental drift to form strata of siltstone, sandstone, conglomerate and coal. During recent geologic history, the Chuckanut formation was overridden by four or more glaciations.

Point Roberts consists of a series of the resulting glacial sediments resting upon the Chuckanut Formation. The lowest glacial sediments (now near sea level) are from Salmon Springs or older glaciations. At the peak of the most recent glaciation, the main ice sheet was in excess of 7,000 feet thick as it moved southward between Vancouver Island and the Canadian Coast Range and down the Strait of Georgia. A smaller lobe of the continental glacier in excess of 5,000 feet traveled down the Fraser River flood plains merging with the main ice sheet over the greater Vancouver area and Whatcom and Skagit Counties. The coalesced continental ice sheet traveled south terminating in the vicinity of Chehalis, Washington. Relatively impermeable Vashon glacial lodgment till (estimated to be as much as 40 feet thick at the uppermost layer) was plastered over the advance outwash as the weight of the 7,000 foot thick plus Strait of Georgia ice lobe moved southward over approximately 10,000 years. (Armstrong, et al., 1965) Point Roberts, Tsawwassen, and part of British Columbia extending past English Bluff comprised an island at the close of the Vashon Glaciation, approximately 11,000 years ago.

As the ice sheets melted, the thinner Fraser Lobe began to float while the Strait of Georgia lobe acted as a dam forming a lake under the Fraser Lobe. Sediments settling from the melting, floating ice resulted in the accumulation of 300 feet or more of glacial marine drift over much of western Whatcom County. (Easterbrook, 1976; Geologic Map of Western Whatcom County, Washington, USGS, Map I-854-B) This glacial marine drift is generally soft and was not consolidated by the weight of the glacier. A discontinuous, thin mantle of this glacial marine drift above the glacial lodgement till has been identified sporadically across Point Roberts. The uppermost layer of glacial sediments consists of recessional sand, silt, and gravel deposited as the Strait of Georgia ice lobe receded. Since the recession of the glaciers, the Fraser River has deposited deltaic sediments on the north and easterly side of the Point Roberts-Tsawwassen Island, connecting it to the Greater Vancouver mainland (approximately 2,500 years ago, Murray 2008). At some locations, these sediments have been eroded or removed, exposing the lodgement till.

Parks and features

 Maple Beach (NE) 
 Monument Park (NW)
 Lighthouse Marine Park (SW)
 Point Roberts Skate Park (Central - recreational open space)
 Lily Point Marine Reserve (SE)
 Cascadia Marine Trail (S and E)

Neighborhoods
 South Beach Estates (beach rights)
 Bells Grove
 Crystal Waters 
 Freeman Beach
 Lily Point
 Maple Beach
 Waters Plat
 Ocean View Estates
 Seabright Farm Cottages

Climate
Despite its proximity to 49 °N latitude, Point Roberts has an Oceanic climate (Köppen: Cfb) although winters may be colder for this climatic subtype, similar to the Vancouver-Seattle-Portland axis. Point Roberts lies within a depression created by Vancouver Island, the north shore mountains surrounding Vancouver, and the North Cascades (including Mount Baker). This micro-climate provides some of the mildest weather in the Pacific Northwest. While 49 °N latitude suggests a harsh winter, snow averages and low January temperatures are milder than the American average:  in vs  and  vs , respectively. Although the amount of rainfall is less than the regional average, it is better-distributed through the year , with 146 days of precipitation. The comfort index is high.

Demographics
As of the 2010 United States Census, there were 1,314 people, 678 households, and 372 families residing in the Point Roberts ZCTA (ZIP Code Tabulation Area). There were 2,068 housing units, only 678 (33%) of which were occupied. The racial makeup of the ZCTA was 91.9% White, 0.8% African American, 0.8% Native American, 4.5% Asian, 0.3% from other races, and 1.7% from two or more races. Hispanics or Latinos of any race were 2.4% of the population.

The age distribution was 16.2% under 20, 3.0% from 20 to 24, 16.2% from 25 to 44, 40.7% from 45 to 64, and 23.9% who were 65 or older. The median age was 52.7 years.

The median income for a household in the ZCTA was $58,672; the median income for a family was $75,724; and the per capita income was $39,696.

During the summer the population swells to about 4,500, most of the visitors being vacationing Canadians.

Point Roberts' population includes descendants of Icelandic immigrants, who first settled there in the 1890s.

Economy

Many of the area's businesses serve weekend and recreational visitors from Greater Vancouver. Canadians visit for cheaper American gasoline, alcohol, and food when the Canadian dollar is strong; Americans from Point Roberts do the same in Canada. Many Canadians visited its bars and nightclubs on Sundays until Sunday drinking was legalized in British Columbia in 1986. The local post office and several private companies rent many post office boxes to individuals and businesses from the Greater Vancouver area, who find it a convenient and fast way to receive mail and parcels from the United States without paying for cross-border shipping costs. The U.S. Consulate General in Vancouver also used the Point Roberts post office, but it has since changed to using one in Blaine, directly on the border.

Because entry to Point Roberts from the rest of the U.S. requires two international border crossings, it has sometimes been described as "the best gated community in the U.S." Residents enjoy a low crime rate, with a high local security presence. While there is one doctor's clinic, there is no hospital, dentist, pharmacist or veterinarian, and because American health insurers will not pay for treatment from Canadian providers, Point Roberts residents usually seek medical care in Bellingham, Washington, although Vancouver is closer.

Point Roberts has a single grocery store, which threatened to close in July 2021 due to the prolonged COVID-19 travel restrictions. An emergency grant of $100,000 from the state government was approved in late June to prevent its closure.

Education
Point Roberts Primary School, the only school on the Point, provides only kindergarten and first, second and third grades. From fourth grade on (previously third grade), American children must take a 40-minute ride through British Columbia, crossing back into the United States at Blaine, Washington. Canadian children can attend school in Delta, British Columbia.

Infrastructure

Transportation
The only authorized land access to Canada from Point Roberts is Point Roberts-Boundary Bay Border Crossing, the westernmost in the Lower 48. On the US side, this major thoroughfare northward is named Tyee Drive; on the Canadian side, it is 56th Street. Point Roberts also has a small airport (Point Roberts Airpark) and a large marina (Point Roberts Marina Resort) for air and water access; these two point facilities allow direct access to the rest of Washington state without the need to enter Canada.

A temporary passenger ferry service from Point Roberts to Blaine operated by the Port of Bellingham and the Whatcom Transportation Authority entered service in August 2020 amid the COVID-19 pandemic, which had closed the Canadian border to non-essential travel for several months. The ferry used two vessels leased from San Juan Cruises and was fare-free. It was initially run once per week, but the frequency was increased to twice a week and the ferry was diverted to serve the Bellingham Cruise Terminal due to high demand. Ferry service ended in August 2021.

Roosevelt Road follows the US side of the border across the peninsula. To the west, it ends at a small park, Monument Park built around Monument 1, the westernmost point of the 49th parallel border.

Telecommunications
Until 1988, Point Roberts telephone numbers were in British Columbia's area code 604 and served by BCTel, the local telephone company for most of British Columbia. It was served by the 945 exchange which was officially in area code 206, the area code for most of western Washington, but protected in 604, resulting in the oddity of calls from British Columbia being local calls while calls from Washington and the rest of the United States were billed as international calls. In 1988, Point Roberts service was severed from BC Tel, and the protection of the 604-945 prefix ended, at the expense of losing the ability to make local calls to any other exchange in either country. Along with the rest of Whatcom County, Point Roberts moved to area code 360 in 1995. The local regular-service telecom provider is Whidbey Telecom.

Although Point Roberts is nominally part of the Seattle television market, the only over-the-air stations available in the town come from the Metro Vancouver region and Bellingham, Washington. Cable television in Point Roberts was provided by Delta Cable, a subsidiary of Canadian cable company EastLink. Delta Cable pulled out of Point Roberts with short notice in August 2019.

Whidbey Telecom is the broadband Internet provider to residents of Point Roberts. In 2019, Whidbey Telecom began construction to provide fiber-optic Internet to Point Roberts.

Mobile telephone service is provided by a variety of companies, both American and Canadian.

Notable residents
Current
Glen Hanlon, former National Hockey League goaltender and former ice hockey coach
Michael S. McLean, Emmy award winner and former Hollywood director, editor and producer
Ross Douglas, songwriter, musician and actor

Past
Pavel Bure, former National Hockey League forward
Roger Fisher, founding guitarist of rock band Heart and its previous incarnations (departed 1979); lived in Point Roberts during the writing of Heart's debut album Dreamboat Annie (1975), which was recorded in Vancouver, British Columbia
Margaret Laurence, Canadian novelist and short story writer
Kekuta Manneh, Gambian-born soccer player, formerly of Vancouver Whitecaps FC; adopted by an American family and lived in Point Roberts to fulfill his residency requirements for the American citizenship he received in September 2016
Alexander Mogilny, former National Hockey League forward
Dave Nonis, National Hockey League former senior vice president and general manager with the Toronto Maple Leafs
 Bob Robertson, longtime Northwest play-by-play sportscaster, lived in Point Roberts as a teen
Katee Sackhoff, actress; lived in Point Roberts during filming the TV series Battlestar Galactica from 2004 to 2009 in Vancouver, British Columbia
John Tortorella, coach of the Philadelphia Flyers; former ice hockey coach with Vancouver Canucks
Nancy Wilson, guitarist and vocalist of rock band Heart (1974–present); lived in Point Roberts during writing of Heart's debut album Dreamboat Annie (1975), which was recorded in Vancouver, British Columbia

See also
 Border irregularities of the United States
 Oregon boundary dispute
 Tsawwassen, British Columbia
 Río Rico, Tamaulipas, a city that was once an exclave of the United States, now ceded to Mexico
 Northwest Angle, another US pene-exclave in Canada

References

Further reading
 Clark, Richard E. (1980). Point Roberts, USA: The History of a Canadian Enclave. Textype Publishing.
 Murray, Anne (2006). A Nature Guide to Your Boundary Bay. Nature Guides B.C., Delta
 Point Roberts Census County Division, Whatcom County, Washington. United States Census Bureau.
 Swenson, Mark (2017). Point Roberts Backstory: Tales, Trails and Trivia from an American Exclave. Village Books..

External links

 Point Roberts Chamber of Commerce
 
 Geologic Map from Washington State Department of Natural Resources
 Zoning Map from Whatcom County

Census-designated places in Whatcom County, Washington
Exclaves in the United States
Border irregularities of the United States
Peninsulas of Washington (state)
Borders of Washington (state)
Landforms of Whatcom County, Washington
Cities in Whatcom County, Washington
Delta, British Columbia